Linsan is a town and sub-prefecture in the Lélouma Prefecture in the Labé Region of northern-central Guinea.

References

Sub-prefectures of the Labé Region